Universal Religion Chapter 3, also known as Universal Religion 2008 - Live From Armada At Ibiza is the third compilation album in the Universal Religion compilation series mixed and compiled by Dutch DJ and record producer Armin van Buuren. It was released on 8 October 2007 by Armada Music.

The digital download version was released on 12 December 2007 on iTunes and contains edits of the individual songs listed, as well as the full continuous mix.

Track listing

Charts

References

External links
 at Discogs

Armin van Buuren compilation albums
Electronic compilation albums
2007 compilation albums